Norman General (October 18, 1893 – August 14, 1974) was a Canadian long-distance runner. He competed in the marathon at the 1920 Summer Olympics.

References

1893 births
1974 deaths
Athletes (track and field) at the 1920 Summer Olympics
Canadian male long-distance runners
Canadian male marathon runners
Olympic track and field athletes of Canada
Track and field athletes from Ontario